American Football Ireland (AFI) is the National Governing Body for American football for Ireland and Northern Ireland. Founded in 1984 the AFI is entirely volunteer run and all American football played in Ireland is played at an amateur level.

History

1980s and 1990s 

The first Shamrock Bowl game was played in 1986 between the Craigavon Cowboys and the Dublin Celts. The Cowboys won the first title played in Dublin. The Celts then went on to be the number 1 team in Ireland for the next 10 years, winning the Shamrock Bowl 5 times. 
The Celts were also the First Irish team to represent Ireland in the Euro Bowl – the then Champions league of European American Football.

2000s 
During 2000, plans were made to resurrect the IAFL. The only fixture to be played in Ireland that year was an Irish selection against a visiting high school team - Mount St. Josephs from Maryland USA. In 2001, the Carrickfergus Knights, Dublin Dragons, Dublin Rebels and University of Limerick Vikings played a full league season of football. The Dublin Rebels defeated the Carrickfergus Knights in Shamrock Bowl XV, which was played in Carrickfergus.

All four teams participated in the reformation of the Irish American Football League (IAFL). A new league structure and administration was put in place and the IAFL helped form the Irish American Football Association (IAFA) - the new national governing body for the sport. During 2002, the sport found a new lease on life in Ireland. Again, four teams contested the league with the Carrickfergus Knights defeating the UL Vikings in Shamrock Bowl XVI. However, during the course of the year there were some significant developments. Firstly, three development teams applied to join the league for 2003. Secondly, an Irish team won an International club competition for the first time ever. In June, the Dublin Rebels travelled to Belgium and won the Charleroi Trophy against the Charleroi Cougars and two French teams - Reims Champs and Forbach Taupes. The season finished on a high note with the visit of Team Canada, the Canadian U21 team. The Carrickfergus Knights played Team Canada in Dublin and performed well in a 34–6 defeat.

2003 turned out to be one of the best years ever for Irish American football. Three more teams – Cork, Belfast & Craigavon – joined the IAFL bringing the total up to seven. The Carrickfergus Knights, Cork Admirals, Dublin Dragons and Dublin Rebels played in Division 1. The Belfast Bulls, Craigavon Cowboys and UL Vikings played in Division 2 which was created to help development teams get competitive game experience.

Membership in the IAFL increased significantly and the standard of play was higher than in previous years. In June 2003, the Dublin Rebels returned to Belgium to defend their Charleroi Trophy title. They were joined in Belgium by the Carrickfergus Knights. The Rebels won the Charleroi Trophy, defeating local team, the Charleroi Cougars in the Tournament final. The Knights came third, ahead of French team, Celtes de Mitry.

The Knights finished first in the league to qualify for the Shamrock Bowl. The Rebels beat the Cork Admirals in the semi-final and then defeated the Knights 24–12 in a spectacular Shamrock Bowl XVII, played at Suttonians RFC in Dublin. The game attracted a large crowd and some media attention - highlights were broadcast on TV3 in Ireland and Sky Sports throughout Europe. The Belfast Bulls won the Division 2 title. The season finished with the first ever IAFL Allstar game in which the North defeated the South 7–0.

During the 2003/2004 off-season, Coach Phil DeMonte (ex-Oxford University Cavaliers) was appointed as the Head Coach of the Irish National Team and IAFL Allstars. Coach DeMonte will also help with the education of coaches throughout Ireland. 2004 promised to be the best season ever for Irish American football both on and off the field and did not fail to deliver. 6 teams played a full competitive league schedule and the standard of play was higher than at any time in the previous 10 years. IAFL membership reached an all-time high of more than 300 registered players. All teams had bigger rosters and most of the rookies were in the 17–21 age group. The Dublin Rebels defeated the Carrickfergus Knights 24–22 in Shamrock Bowl XVIII. The game, which attracted a record attendance for an IAFL game, is regarded as the best ever Shamrock Bowl. 2004 also saw the return of the Ireland team. The team played two fixtures including the inaugural Celtic Classic against John Carroll University from Ohio, USA.

In 2005 the same six teams competed for the Shamrock Bowl. Again the Rebels ran out victorious with a tough fought win against the Belfast Bulls in the big game.
The 2006 season saw the addition of new teams the DCU Saints and Dublin Marshals to the IAFL making the total number of competing teams, 8, the highest it had been in many years. The UL Vikings faced the Rebels in the Bowl game, which the Rebels won, making it their fourth consecutive Shamrock Bowl win.

The 2007 season was contested by nine teams, following the addition of the Belfast Trojans and the Tallaght Outlaws to the league. The 2007 Shamrock Bowl was won by UL Vikings.

After the 2008 season, the Tallaght Outlaws decided to stop playing in the league, after playing two full seasons in the league.

Structure 
in 1984, AFI has 3 sections:
 Senior American Football (18 year olds and above)
 Youth American Football (15-18 year olds)
 Flag Football (non-contact, 16 year olds and above)

Within the Senior American Football section, there are 3 separate divisions:

AFI Premier Division - top four teams qualify for the playoffs of which the finalists compete for the Shamrock Bowl. The current champions are University College Dublin.
AFI Division 1 - top four teams qualify for the playoffs of which the finalists compete for the AFI Division 1 Bowl. The current champions are the Westmeath Minatours
AFI Division 2 - top two teams qualify for the AFI Division 2 Bowl. The current champions are the Antrim Jets.

The Youth American Football section expands year on year, with a record 7 teams competing for the AFI Youth Plate in 2019. The Cork Admirals are the current champions.

The Flag Football section is split into 2 separate conferences:

AFI Flag Premier Division - top six teams qualify for the playoffs of which the finalists compete for the Emerald Bowl. The current champions are the Craigavon Cowboys.
AFI Flag Division 1 - top six teams qualify for the playoffs of which the finalists compete for the Glas Bowl. The current champions are the South Dublin Panthers.

The Premier Division consists of eight senior teams. For the 2021 Season, the Premier Division will consist of:
 An 8-game, 16-week regular season running from March to early July
 A six-team, four-week single elimination playoff tournament beginning with the wildcard round in July and culminating in the Shamrock Bowl in August

Teams 
The League consists of three tiers of football, starting with the Premier Division, also known as the SBC. Below are the IAFL 1 and IAFL 2 divisions. The 2019 season was the last year the League ran due to the COVID-19 pandemic.

Premier Division (SBC)

Division 1 (IAFL 1)

Division 2 (IAFL 2)

Defunct teams 
 Drogheda Lightning
 Belfast Bulls
 Carlow Chargers
 Dublin Celts
 Erris Rams
 Midlands Soldiers
 Tallaght Outlaws
 Dublin Dragons
 North Dublin Marshals
 North Kildare Reapers
 South Kildare Soldiers
 Belfast Blitzers
 Tennents Giants (Belfast) Founded 1985
 East Side Jets (East Belfast)
 Belfast Spartans
 Antrim Bulldogs
 Coleraine Chieftains 
 Tyrone Titans
 East Antrim Cougars
 Dublin Tornadoes

Results

2006 season 
Note: W = Wins, L = Losses, T = Ties
League Table

2007 season 

Format

In 2007, to cope with the growing number of teams, a divisional format was introduced to replace the old league format. In it, the existing teams were divided into three divisions, Northern, Central and Southern, three teams in each. The idea of the divisional format is that any new teams, such as the up-coming development teams, will easily fit into the divisional format without dramatically increasing the length of the season, which currently runs from February/March to Early August. The top team from each division all go into the play-offs and the two second placed teams, with the highest numbers of points, playing a wildcard game for the 4th spot. The winners of the playoffs battle it out for the Shamrock Bowl.

The 2007 IAFL season, complete with new divisional format was due to begin on 4 March with the College Championship game between DCU Saints and UL Vikings, but the game was delayed due to rain, so the season proper began on 25 March when the Cork Admirals beat the Belfast Bulls, the UL Vikings beat the Tallaght Outlaws and Dublin Rebels (then Shamrock Bowl Holders) beat the DCU Saints. The season continued throughout April and May, with the IAFL College Championship Game eventually been rescheduled on 3 June, with the UL Vikings beating the DCU Saints 50–2.

During the course of the regular season, two non-league games were played against foreign opposition, with CMS College Stags beating the Tallaght Outlaws 67–0 and, in the Claddagh Classic on 2 June, the Team USA All-Stars beat the Carrickfergus Knights 26–0.

Note: W = Wins, L = Losses, T = Ties

Northern Division

Central Division

Southern Division

The play-off positions were decided on the last day of the regular season, with the Belfast Bulls, Dublin Rebels and UL Vikings securing their respective Divisional titles and the Belfast Trojans and Cork Admirals as the wildcard teams. Cork Admirals won the wildcard game and set up a play-off tie with the Dublin Rebels, strongly fancied to retain the Shamrock Bowl for the 5th consecutive time. However, Cork managed to win a close fought 8–6 victory and secured their first ever bowl appearance against UL Vikings, who beat the Belfast Bulls 44–2 to set the stage for the first ever all-Munster Shamrock Bowl. The UL Vikings won a close game 22–14 to win Shamrock Bowl XXI and claim their first ever title.

2008 season 

An AGM held on 25 November decided the format for the 2008 season. It was decided to gradually phase out under 18 kitted players and start a junior (i.e. 16–18 age group) league. It was also decided to run a DV-8's league, where development teams and entrants from already established teams can field rookies in 8 a side matches. This would also help teams who are just starting out to get some playing time and reduce the pressure to find new players, which has plagued new IAFL teams in the past.

It was decided to keep the league format the same. The same teams will compete in the same divisions, with the exception of the Dublin Rhinos, a spin-off from the Dublin Dragons, who will replace the Dragons in the IAFL Central. The league for 2008 looks like this.

The Development League (DV8) consists of the following teams.

2009 season 
It was decided to continue running the DV-8's league, where development teams could learn and improve on the basics of football in a competitive league setting. This would also help teams who are just starting out to get some playing time and reduce the pressure to find new players, which has plagued new IAFL teams in the past.

The IAFL format was changed to a single division rather than the previous North, South and Central divisions in which each team would play eight matches, seeded to make the league more competitive. the top four teams would go to the playoffs in which the number 1 seeded team would face the number 4 seeded team, and the number 2 seeded team would face the number 2 seeded team. both winners would then play in the shamrock bowl. the league looks like this:

The Development League (DV8) consists of the following teams.

2010 season 
The 2010 IAFL season, has returned to the divisional format. There are now an unprecedented number of teams competing in this fast growing league with a total of 11 teams taking part in the senior IAFL and 3 teams plus a number of rookie teams provided by some of the larger senior teams in the DV-8's. The league format will look like this:

Note: W = Wins, L = Losses, T = Ties

Northern Division

Central Division

Southern Division

DV8's

2011 season

2012 season 

This years IAFL will be contested by a record 11 teams. The Tullamore Phoenix step up from DV8s level to join the ten sides who contested the 2011 season. The regular will start in late February, which is earlier than in previous years. It will conclude on 10 June. The playoffs and Shamrock Bowl will take place from mid June to mid July.

The big change this year is that the structure has been changed from 3 regional divisions to 2 regional divisions – IAFL North and IAFL South. These divisions will have 5 and 6 teams respectively as opposed to either 3 or 4 under last years format. This change gives a better balance between the divisions.  Consequently, there will be some changes to the playoff structure. The top team in each division will host a Semi-Final.  Each 3rd placed team will travel to the 2nd placed team in their division in the Wildcard round.

As with last year, each team will play 8 regular season games. Most teams will play all the teams in their division once and a selection of teams in the other division. This is a change from last years format whereby teams played home and away against all divisional opponents. However, the change gives teams a greater variety of opponents as well more common opponents.

There are 4 doubleheaders scheduled for the upcoming season where four teams will play at one venue on the same day. Each of these should be great day out for IAFL supporters.

The schedule and divisional standings can be found below. Please note that there are a small number confirmations to be made, so please check this site regularly for updates. One of these confirmations is the annual Colours match between Trinity College and UCD.

Note: W = Wins, L = Losses, T = Ties

North

South

2013 season 

Note: W = Wins, L = Losses, T = Ties

North

South

2014 season 
Note: W = Wins, L = Losses, T = Ties

North

South

2015 season 
Note: W = Wins, L = Losses, T = Ties

North

South

2016 season 
Note: W = Wins, L = Losses, T = Ties
North

South

2016 Playoffs 
Shamrock Bowl Preview
Shamrock Bowl Results

2017 season

2018 season

2018 Playoffs

2019 season

2019 playoffs

2022 season

Season standings

2022 Playoffs

League MVP award winners

References

External links
 

Sports leagues established in 1984
1984 establishments in Ireland